Paige Bailey-Gayle (born 12 November 2001) is an English-born Jamaican professional footballer who plays as a forward for FA Women's Championship club Crystal Palace and the Jamaica women's national team.

Club career
Bailey-Gayle started her senior career with Arsenal. She was promoted into the club's first-team squad in November 2018 under manager Joe Montemurro, with the forward making her professional debut on 18 November during a 0–4 win away to Everton at Haig Avenue. After a total of four appearances for Arsenal, Bailey-Gayle departed at the conclusion of 2018–19 – subsequently joining Championship side Leicester City on 24 June 2019. She scored her first senior goal on 29 September in a home defeat to Crystal Palace. On 20 February 2020, Bailey-Gayle scored both goals in a 2–1 victory against Reading in the FA Cup fifth round.

International career
Bailey-Gayle represented England at U17 level. She was called up for the 2018 UEFA Women's Under-17 Championship in Lithuania, having previously won four caps in qualifying; in the tournament proper, Bailey-Gayle featured four further times as England finished fourth. In July 2018, Bailey-Gayle was selected by the U18s for a three-team tournament at St George's Park.

In 2021 Bailey-Gayle was selected for Jamaica senior international duty and made her debut against Costa Rica.

Personal life
Bailey-Gayle attended Stoke Newington School, featuring for their football team. She also played cricket as a youngster, notably being selected by Victoria Park & Tower Hamlets for the 2015 London Youth Games.

Career statistics
.

Honours
Arsenal
FA Women's Super League: 2018–19
FA Women's League Cup: Runner up 2019

Leicester City
 FA Women's Championship: 2020–21

Individual
FA Women's Championship Player of the month: February 2020

References

External links

2001 births
Living people
Citizens of Jamaica through descent
Jamaican women's footballers
Women's association football forwards
Jamaica women's international footballers
Footballers from Greater London
English women's footballers
Arsenal W.F.C. players
Leicester City W.F.C. players
Women's Super League players
Women's Championship (England) players
English sportspeople of Jamaican descent
Black British sportswomen
England women's youth international footballers